The Architect is the fourth studio album by British singer Paloma Faith, released by Sony Music Entertainment on 17 November 2017.

Faith stated, "The Architect is a social observation record. I was adamant that I wouldn't write about love. I wanted to look outside of myself. I'm coming at politics from the perspective of the common man or woman, observing why people are suffering. Each song on the record is about a different pocket of the socio-political world that I've been delving into. I wanted to write something more modern. On previous albums I've been more concerned with the past, but now I'm looking forward because of motherhood and wanting to change things for a better future. It's a marriage of old and new."

The Architect debuted at number one on the UK Albums Chart, selling over 40,000 copies, becoming Faith's first UK chart-topping album and pushing Reputation by Taylor Swift from the top spot. Following the release of the Zeitgeist Edition in November 2018, The Architect re-entered the UK Albums Chart Top 40 at number twenty-two.

Background
In June 2015, during her Glastonbury Festival performance, Faith confirmed having started the process of creating her fourth studio album. "Now we're going to bring to your attention what I've been listening to a lot when making album number four," she told the crowd, before performing a cover of "Purple Haze" by Jimi Hendrix. In addition to the inspiration from Hendrix, Faith has also stated she has been listening to "a lot of psychedelic rock", including Janis Joplin. In another interview Faith stated she is very happy and hasn't "anything to moan about" in her current relationship, which led her to conclude that "there's a lot of things going on in the world that are [just] as important as love". As a result, Faith attempted to write songs which "aren't about love or heartache", something the singer found challenging. In a Facebook post dated 10 June 2016, Faith indicated that the new album would have a full orchestra on part of it, "composed by David Arnold".

On 22 August 2016, in a letter to fans (handwritten by Faith) was posted on her website, announcing that she was pregnant, after spending her "whole life" wanting to be a mother. The "Update" also says that, after working with the "amazing" Jesse Shatkin her fourth album would be entitled "The Architect" and released in 2017. After her maternity break, Faith said she would return "full of energy and excited to come and sing for you again".

Faith released the first single from the album, "Crybaby" on 31 August 2017, in the process announcing the release date, before putting the album up for pre-order on 22 September 2017, along with the tracklisting and album artwork. She also confirmed a collaboration with actor Samuel L. Jackson.

Singles
The album's first single was the disco-tinged "Crybaby", written in collaboration with the producer Starsmith. It was made available for streaming and download on 31 August 2017. The song's dystopian-themed music video was directed by Thomas James, and was released on 22 September 2017 alongside the album pre-order and the release of tour dates for Faith's 2018 UK arena tour. The song peaked at number 36 on the UK Singles Chart. On 22 October it was announced that "Guilty" would be the second single. On 24 January, Faith announced through an Instagram post that "'Til I'm Done" would be released the following day as the third single from the recording; this information was later posted on different websites, in which it was stated that the single would impact radio stations on 16 February while a remix EP would be released on 2 February. Faith's cover of "Make Your Own Kind of Music" was announced in April 2018 to be included on the album's digital track listing, thus becoming its fourth official single. The song was included on the track listing on 20 April 2018, over a month after the cover's original release date. "Warrior" was released as the fifth single on 6 July 2018. "Loyal" was released as the first single from the Zeitgeist Edition with an accompanying lyric video on 11 October 2018.

Critical reception

At Metacritic, which assigns a normalised rating out of 100 to reviews from mainstream critics, The Architect received an average score of 72 based on six reviews, indicating "generally favourable reviews".

Track listing

Notes
  signifies an additional producer
  signifies a co-producer

Charts

Weekly charts

Year-end charts

Certifications

References

2017 albums
Paloma Faith albums
Albums produced by Klas Åhlund
Albums produced by Greg Kurstin
Albums produced by Jake Gosling
Albums produced by Fraser T. Smith
Albums recorded at Electro-Vox Recording Studios
Albums produced by TMS (production team)